Club Deportivo Maldonado is a football club from Maldonado, Uruguay. They currently play in the Uruguayan Primera División following their promotion from the Uruguayan Segunda División at the end of the 2019 season.

History

Club Deportivo Maldonado, SAD have a history of being a Middle Men club used by  third-party owners, where top flight South American clubs will sell players to the team before they are immediately sold or loaned to another club, with the player never appearing for Deportivo Maldonado. Notable players who've made this type of transfer include Allan, Jonathan Calleri, Gerónimo Rulli, Hernán Toledo, Alex Sandro, Marcelo Estigarribia, Willian José and Iván Piris.

Current squad

References

External links
  
 Official website of the parent sports club 

 
Football clubs in Uruguay
Association football clubs established in 1928
1928 establishments in Uruguay